Muir Central College in Allahabad in northern India was a college of higher education founded by William Muir in 1872. It had a separate existence to 1921, when as a result of the Allahabad University Act it was merged into Allahabad University.

The buildings (1872–1886) were a design by the British architect William Emerson. Initially the college was affiliated with the University of Calcutta.

The Muir Central College and the university were conceived to train, equip and mould the youth of the country to shoulder the responsibilities of life. Its students as the time passed by were spread all over the country and abroad filling up learned professions, the public and social services the world of trade and industry and the spheres of politics and diplomacy. Besides, it was conceived as a centre of research and academic advancement.

According to historian Avril Powell, certain debates between Saiyid Ahmed Khan, the founder of Muhammadan Anglo-Oriental College in Aligarh, and William Muir led to the founding of Muir Central College. Whereas the universities at Calcutta, Bombay, and Madras (the first in India) had classes taught in English, "Muir College opened in 1872 with three departments of equal standing, teaching respectively through the vernaculars, the 'oriental' classics and English."
There was Maulawi Zaka Allah, Professor of Vernacular Science and Literature, who taught Arabic, Persian, Urdu and mathematics. One of the students' favorites was Aditya Ram Bhattacharya, professor of Sanskrit. 
Arthur Reid was professor of law from 1883 to 1895, and Homersham Cox came to teach mathematics in 1891.

"For its first 15 years the Muir College was able to prove itself a valuable half-way house situated rather precariously between the near monopoly of English in Calcutta University and the uniqueness of the new Punjab University’s fully fledged Oriental Department."

"By the late 1880s the Muir Central College examination results marked it as north India’s most academically successful college outside Calcutta. It would remain the nerve centre of Allahabad University until 1922, academically, socially, politically and on the games field, its 'Muir hostel', added in 1911, contributing to an espirit de corps that was to prove long-lasting."

In 1922 Allahabad University merged with Muir Central College and English became the standard medium.
Allahabad University, with Muir College at its core, was to become renowned from the late 1920s to the late 1950s as the 'Oxford of India' during a 'golden era' of teaching and research.

Principals
1872–1885 Augustus Spiller Harrison
1886–1895 Archibald Edward Gough
1895–1906? Georg Thibaut
James George Jennings
1913 Ernest George Hill (died 1917)
1918–1920 William Arthur Jobson Archbold
1920–1922 Jeremiah Joseph Ernest Durack

See also
 Ganesh Prasad

References
 Amarantha Jha (1938) A History of Muir Central College 1872 — 1922, Allahabad University, Google Books notice

Defunct universities and colleges in India
University of Allahabad
Universities and colleges in Allahabad
1921 disestablishments in India
1872 establishments in British India
1920s disestablishments in British India
Indo-Saracenic Revival architecture
Multiculturalism in Asia
The Calcutta University Calendar, 1888,1889,1890
Atul Krishna Ghosh Medalist 1887 MA English Muir Central College, CU
Atul Krishna Ghosh, Muir Alumni, Principal Maharajah Mohindra College Patiala 1888-1907